Clamtown is an unincorporated community on Route 443 in West Penn Township, Schuylkill County, Pennsylvania, United States, approximately five miles south of Tamaqua. The Little Schuylkill River forms its natural northern and western boundaries and separates it from Walker Township. It is split between the post offices of New Ringgold and Tamaqua, with the zip codes of 17960 and 18252, respectively. Clamtown is in Area Code 570 served by the 386 exchange.

Landscape and Scenery
Clamtown is a quaint village surrounded by rolling, forested mountains. There is a small creek running directly through the village that feeds into the Little Schuylkill River. The village also has a small lake commonly known as the "Little Schuylkill Lake" that is just outside of it. Some fish such as trout can be found here. The lake itself is presumed to be man made due to the abandoned train depot directly next to it. 

Unincorporated communities in Schuylkill County, Pennsylvania
Unincorporated communities in Pennsylvania